Chase Ford (born July 19, 1990) is a former American football tight end. He was signed by the Philadelphia Eagles as an undrafted free agent in 2012, and has also played for the Minnesota Vikings and Baltimore Ravens. He played college football at Kilgore College from 2008–09, then played at the University of Miami.

Early years
Ford attended Corrigan-Camden High School in Corrigan, Texas, where he was a letterman in football, basketball and track. In football, he played as a tight end, and earned All-District honors as a senior. In basketball, he was named to All-State basketball team in Class 2A. In track & field, he competed as a sprinter and ran the third leg on the Bulldogs' 4 × 400 m relay squad, helping them win the Texas Class 2A T&F Meet with a time of 3:20.08 minutes.

Following his senior season, he played football at Kilgore Junior College in Kilgore, Texas, where he earned 2nd-Team JUCO All-America honors after leading the conference with 32 receptions for 545 receiving yards.

College career
After his sophomore season at Kilgore, Ford chose to enroll at the University of Miami over scholarship offers from Arizona and Illinois. He played for the Miami Hurricanes football team as a tight end from 2010 to 2011. As a junior in 2010, he appeared in nine games, recording 37 yards against Notre Dame in the Sun Bowl. He had three games with at least two catches. As a senior in 2011, he played in all 12 games, recording at least one catch in seven games. He scored his lone touchdown of the season against Duke. He registered a season-high 33-yard reception against Kansas State. He also recorded two receptions in games against Florida State and Virginia.

He majored in sociology at the University of Miami, earning his degree in spring 2012.

Professional career

2012 NFL Combine

Philadelphia Eagles
On April 29, 2012, he signed with the Philadelphia Eagles as an undrafted free agent, where he spent a week on the practice squad.

Minnesota Vikings
On December 26, 2012, he was signed with the Minnesota Vikings to join the practice squad. Ford was added to the roster in 2013 when starting Tight End Kyle Rudolph was injured. In 2013 he played in 9 games, made 11 catches for 133 yards with a 12.1 catch average. The following season, he played in 11 games with 23 catches for 258 yards and one touchdown for 22 yards.

He was waived on November 11, 2015. He then was re-signed to the practice squad on November 13, 2015.

Baltimore Ravens
On November 17, 2015, Ford was signed from the Minnesota Vikings practice squad to the Ravens. He was placed on the team's injured reserve on November 30. On April 12, 2016, the Ravens waived Ford making him a free agent.

Cleveland Browns
Ford was claimed off waivers by the Cleveland Browns on April 13, 2016. On April 20, 2016, the Browns released Ford.

References

External links
Miami Hurricanes bio
Minnesota Vikings bio

1990 births
Living people
American football tight ends
Miami Hurricanes football players
Philadelphia Eagles players
Minnesota Vikings players
Baltimore Ravens players
Cleveland Browns players